The Gentle Rain is a 1966 American-Brazilian drama film directed by Burt Balaban and starring Christopher George, Lynda Day George and Fay Spain. It became best known for its theme tune The Gentle Rain.

Plot
Judy Reynolds (Lynda Day George) is a young lady who is self-described as romantically "frigid", but wants to find her sense of passion for life. She takes an airline flight, running away from her parents in New York City to relocate to Rio de Janeiro. There she meets an attractive man (future real-life husband Christopher George) who is an architect working on a large construction project. He doesn't respond to her polite attempts to begin a conversation, instead returning to a table where his drink is sitting. Judy apologizes for disturbing him and leaves.

Later, Judy's acquaintance Nancy (Fay Spain) explains that Bill is mute, and has been ever since a terrible accident in which his former girlfriend was killed. Following a party held for English-speaking Americans who live and work in Rio, Judy goes to Bill's apartment where he feebly tries to play guitar for her. He then shows her a letter, the first he has written in years, that states that since their first meeting he has fallen in love with her. She is kind, but states firmly that Bill only thinks that he is in love.

While the rain falls on Bill's window, he writes "Don't pity me" on the glass panes, then collapses in sadness onto his bed. Judy sits on the bed in sympathy to comfort him. He sits up and uses basic gestures to her to explain details of the car roll-over accident that left him mute. Bill was unable to rescue his fiance from the burning wreck, and following his last desperate scream as she died horribly, he was left unable to speak.

Judy continues to meet with Bill, and their relationship begins to grow. After spending the day together touring Rio while holding hands and relaxing in a park where there is a waterfall, they return to his home and make love that evening.

Judy wakes later and has had time to evaluate Bill's mute state. After she dresses, she begins a one-sided conversation with him, and confronts him with the truth that it isn't that he can't speak, but that he won't speak because he has been punishing himself for the past three years. Judy leaves Bill alone in his room to face his inner demon.

At the climax of this story, Bill is wandering around in his room. He realizes he wants his relationship with Judy to continue, but that he is going to have to reconcile with his past to move forward in life. As he continues to wander his room, Bill finally faces his desk telephone, wanting to call her and prove he can speak after all.

Bill fears he has lost Judy for good, and in the end we see him staring at the phone that he must use to save his relationship with Judy. Grabbing his own hair on the sides of his head Bill shakes as though shivering in great frustration. The viewer is left with this frame frozen as the end credits begin to roll, and we never find out if he is able to accomplish the call or if he simply withers back into his own lonely world.

Cast
 Christopher George as Bill Patterson 
 Lynda Day George as Judy Reynolds 
 Fay Spain as Nancy Masters 
 Maria Helena Dias as Gloria 
 Lon Clark as Harry Masters 
 Barbara Williams as Girl Friend 
 Robert Assumpaco as Hotel Manager 
 Herbert Moss as Jimmy
 Bert Caudle Jr. as Party Guest 
 Nadir Fernandes as Nightclub Girl 
 Lorena as Jewelry Girl

References

Bibliography
 K. E. Goldschmitt. Bossa Mundo: Brazilian Music in Transnational Media Industries. Oxford University Press, 2019.

External links
 

1966 films
1966 drama films
1960s English-language films
American drama films
Films directed by Burt Balaban
Brazilian drama films
English-language Brazilian films
Allied Artists films
1960s American films